Dr. Abraham Bredius (18 April 1855 in Amsterdam – 13 March 1946 in Monaco) was a Dutch art collector, art historian, and museum curator.

Life

Bredius travelled widely, visiting various art collections in his youth, and worked at the Dutch Museum for History and Art before becoming director, from 1889 to 1909, of the Mauritshuis. He became a Rembrandt expert who had many differences of opinion with Cornelis Hofstede de Groot. He was a regular contributor to the historical magazines Oud Holland and Künstler-Inventare. 

In 1922, he left the Netherlands for health reasons and settled in Monaco, publishing books in 1927 on Jan Steen and, in 1935, a catalog of Rembrandt paintings, often referred to in the literature as "Bredius 1935". He bequeathed his papers to the Rijksbureau voor Kunsthistorische Documentatie, and his art collection lives on in the Museum Bredius. He also bequeathed several Rembrandt paintings to the National Dutch collection, including Rembrandt's Homer Dictating his Verses.

References

Abraham Bredius in the Dictionary of Art Historians

External links
 Books by Abraham Bredius on the Google Books Library Project
 Abraham Bredius on inghist
Bredius, Dr. Abraham in German Lost Art Foundation Beteiligte Privatpersonen und Körperschaften am NS-Kulturgutraub

1855 births
1946 deaths
Directors of museums in the Netherlands
Dutch art historians
Mauritshuis
Writers from Amsterdam
Dutch LGBT people
Rembrandt scholars
Scholars of Dutch art